Cibyra biedermanni is a species of moth of the family Hepialidae. It is known from Brazil.

References

External links
Hepialidae genera

Hepialidae
Endemic fauna of Bolivia
Lepidoptera of Brazil
Moths of South America
Moths described in 1950